Dowr (also Romanized as Dūr) is a village in Sand-e Mir Suiyan Rural District, Dashtiari District, Chabahar County, Sistan and Baluchestan Province, Iran. At the 2006 census, its population was 408, in 75 families.

References 

Populated places in Chabahar County